WISE 2150–7520 AB (abbreviated W2150AB) is a binary brown dwarf 78.9 light-years distant from Earth in the southern constellation Octans. The system is a wide binary with a separation of 341 astronomical units. The primary of the system was discovered in 2005 as an infrared object with high proper motion and in 2008 was found to be an ultracool dwarf with a spectral type of L. The secondary, a much cooler T dwarf, was discovered by volunteers of the citizen science project Backyard Worlds: Planet 9, using data from the Wide-field Infrared Survey Explorer (WISE). The system was followed up by the project scientists with Magellan and Spitzer and a scientific paper describing the binary was published in the Astrophysical Journal in 2020.

The system belongs to only a few brown dwarf binaries that can be easily resolved by ground-based telescopes. Another example is SDSS J1416+1348.

Brown dwarf system 

The brown dwarfs are separated by 341 astronomical units. Other brown dwarfs show a similar wide binary configuration, like Oph 162225-240515, but most of them are young or have a higher total mass. W2150AB is unusual as it does not show signs of youth. The age of the system was estimated between 0.5 and 10 billion years. The combination of low total mass and large separation results in a low gravitational binding energy for the system. The researchers compared the binding energy and the mass ratio of the system with other brown dwarf binaries and found 2M1101AB as a younger sibling. W2150AB must have formed like other brown dwarf binaries in a more crowded region and left this natal region surviving any interactions with nearby stars or giant molecular clouds that could easily perturb this pair, leaving only two single brown dwarfs.

See also
 LSPM J0207+3331 another object discovered by a Backyard Worlds volunteer
 UScoCTIO 108
 Luhman 16

References

External links
 W2150AB in wiseview tool created by Backyard Worlds volunteers
 W2150B in The Extrasolar Planets Encyclopaedia

Octans
Brown dwarfs
Binary stars
L-type stars
T-type stars
J215018.25-752039.7
WISE objects